Karla Suárez (born October 28, 1969) is a Cuban writer.

Biography 
Karla Suárez was born October 28, 1969, in La Habana, Cuba.
She grew up in Havana, where she ended up studying Electronic Engineering, without putting aside her interest in literature.

Her career as a writer began with the publication of some of her short stories in several anthologies and magazines. The tale Aniversario (t: Anniversary) was adapted for the stage in 1996. Her first collection, Espuma (t: Foam) was published three years later, and two of its short stories were made into TV scripts for Cuban television.

Her debut novel Silencios (t: Silences) won the Spanish award Lengua de Trapo in 1999 and has been translated into several languages. In 2010, this novel was adapted for the stage in France and, in 2013, the University choral ensemble of Montpellier, Ecume, has made "Cubana soy", a creation for the musical theatre.

In 2003, she won the Italian award for international short stories I Colori delle Donne and in both 2006 and 2007 was a member of the jury for the International Literature (Short Stories) Award Juan Rulfo, sponsored by Radio France International in Paris.

In 2007, the Hay Festival and the organizers of the Bogotá World Book Capital selected Karla Suárez as one of the 39 highest profile Latin American writers under the age of 39.

In 2012, her novel Habana, año cero (t: Havana, Year Zero) won the French Prize Carbet from the Caribbean and Tout-Monde and the French award of the insular book.

In 2019, her short story "El pañuelo" (t: The Handkerchief) won the 18th annual Julio Cortázar Award for Best Iberoamerican Story, awarded by The Cuban Book Institute, la Casa de las Américas, and UNEAC.

She also wrote the stories for a books of photos collections with the Italian photographer Francesco Gattoni: Cuba les chemins du hasard, and Rome, par-delà les chemins. And Grietas en las paredes with the Luxembourgois photographer Yvon Lambert.

She got scholarships in Cuba (Razón de Ser) and France (Centre national du livre, Paris) Maison des Ecrivains Etrangers et Traducteurs, Saint-Nazaire; Agence Régionale pour l'Écrit et le Livre en Aquitanie, Bordeaux; and Clermont Communauté, Clermont-Ferrand.

In 1999, she moved to Rome and then in 2004 to Paris. She has lived in Lisbon since 2010. She coordinates the Reading Club of Lisbon at El Instituto Cervantes and she is also Professor of Creative Writing at the Escuela de Escritores in Madrid.

Bibliography

Novels
 1999: Silencios (t: Silence). Spain, Lengua de Trapo,  / RBA, 2002 / Punto de Lectura, 2008, . Cuba, Letras Cubanas, 2008. (Premio Lengua de Trapo, 1999).

 2005: La viajera (t: The Traveller). Spain, Roca Editorial, .

 2011: Habana año cero. Cuba, Editorial UNION, . (Premio Carbet del Caribe, 2012 y   Gran Premio del Libro Insular, 2012. Francia)

 2017: El hijo del héroe. Spain, Editorial COMBA .
2021: Havana Year Zero. Charco Press (English translation by Christina MacSweeney)

Stories
 1999: Espuma (t: Foam). Cuba, Letras Cubanas, . Colombia, Norma, 2001, .

 2001: Carroza para actores (t: A Carriage for Actors). Colombia, Norma, .

 2007: Grietas en las paredes (Photos: Yvon Lambert) (t: Cracks). Belgium, Husson, .

Book travel
 2007: Cuba les chemins du hasard (Photos: Francesco Gattoni) (t: Cuba, The Paths of Chance). France, Le bec en l'air, .

 2014: Rome, par-delà les chemins (Fotos: Francesco Gattoni). Francia,  Editorial Le bec en l'air,

References

Sources
 Editorial Lengua de Trapo
 Roca editorial
 Editions Métailié

External links
 Karla Suárez official web site

1969 births
Living people
20th-century Cuban novelists
Cuban women short story writers
Cuban short story writers
Cuban women novelists
21st-century Cuban novelists